Pascoal Amorim (born 29 July 1995) is a Mozambican football defender for UD Songo.

References

External links
 
 
 

1995 births
Living people
Mozambican footballers
Mozambique international footballers
Association football defenders
Clube Ferroviário da Beira players
UD Songo players